Karthik (born 7 November 1980) is an Indian playback singer. Karthik started his professional singing career as a backing vocalist and has since been working as a playback singer. He has sung in multiple languages including Tamil, Telugu, Malayalam, Kannada, Odia, Bengali, Hindi, Marathi, Tulu and Sanskrit.

This is only a partial list; it is noteworthy that Karthik has sung more than 8000 songs in Telugu, Kannada, Tamil, Malayalam and Hindi.

Tamil songs

Telugu songs

Kannada songs

Malayalam songs

Hindi songs

Bengali and Odia songs 
E Gaan amar Bajimaat

References 

Discographies of Indian artists